Grozyashchiy or Grozyashchy ("Threatening") was a 1135M Burevestnik-class ("Petrel") guard ship (SKR), or frigate with the NATO reporting name 'Krivak-II', that served with the Soviet and Russian Navies. Launched on 7 February 1977, the vessel operated as part of the Pacific Fleet as an anti-submarine vessel, with an armament built around the Metel Anti-Ship Complex. Grozyashchiy undertook a number of visits to nations friendly to the Soviet Union, including Angola, Mauritius, Mozambique and Sri Lanka. The ship also formed part of the Soviet presence during the Sino-Vietnamese conflicts and visited Da Nang, Vietnam, in the October 1981. With the dissolution of the Soviet Union, Grozyashchiy joined the Russian fleet, but lack of funding meant that a planned repair in 1992 was not completed and instead the vessel was decommissioned on 13 February 1995 and sold to be broken up.

Design and development
Grozyashchiy was one of eleven Project 1135M ships launched between 1975 and 1981. Project 1135, the Burevestnik ("Petrel") class, was envisaged by the Soviet Navy as a less expensive complement to the Project 1134A Berkut A (NATO reporting name 'Kresta II') and Project 1134B Berkut B (NATO reporting name 'Kara') classes of ships, which were designated Large Anti-Submarine Ship (BPK) by the Soviets. Project 1135M was an improvement developed in 1972 with slightly increased displacement and heavier guns. The design, by N. P. Sobolov, combined a powerful missile armament with good seakeeping for a blue water role. Originally designated BPK like the larger vessels, this was changed to guard ship (SKR) in 1977 to reflect the Soviet strategy of creating protected areas for friendly submarines close to the coast and to reflect the substantially greater anti-ship capability compared to earlier members of the class through the introduction of new missiles. NATO forces called the vessels 'Krivak-II' class frigates.

Power was provided by two M7K sets, each consisting of a combination of a  DK59 and a  M62 gas turbine combined in a COGAG installation and driving one fixed-pitch propeller. The ship’s complement was 194, including 23 officers.

Armament and sensors
Grozyashchiy was designed for anti-submarine warfare around four URPK-4 Metel missiles (NATO reporting name SS-N-14 'Silex'), backed up by a pair of quadruple launchers for  torpedoes and a pair of RBU-6000  Smerch-2 anti-submarine rocket launchers. The Metel system was upgraded to URPK-5 Rastrub. Both the URPK-5 and the torpedoes had secondary anti-ship capabilities. Defence against aircraft was provided by forty 4K33 OSA-M (SA-N-4 'Gecko') surface to air missiles which were launched from twin-arm ZIF-122 launchers. Two  AK-100 guns were mounted aft in a superfiring arrangement.

The ship had a well-equipped sensor suite, including a single MR-310A Angara-A air/surface search radar, Don navigation radar, the MP-401S Start-S ESM radar system and the Spectrum-F laser warning system. Fire control for the guns was provided by a MR-143 Lev-214 radar. The vessel was also equipped with the PK-16 decoy-dispenser system which used chaff as a form of missile defense.

Construction and career
Laid down by on 4 May 1975 with the yard number 162 at the Yantar Shipyard in Kaliningrad, Grozyashchiy was launched on 7 February 1977. The ship was the fourth of the class built at the yard. The ship was named for a Russian word that can be translated threatening, menacing or terrible. The vessel was commissioned on 30 September and was initially based at Sevastopol. On 24 February 1979, Grozyashchiy set off from the Black Sea to join the Pacific Fleet, calling at a number of port en route in nations that were friendly to the Soviet Union, including Luanda, Angola, and Maputo, Mozambique, on the African mainland and Port Louis in the island nation of Mauritius. The deployment formed part of a wider enlargement of the Soviet presence in Asia.

Arriving at Vladivostok on 3 July 1979, the ship was soon operating in the Indian Ocean and South China Sea. In addition to taking part in fleet manoeuvres, the crew continued to undertake diplomatic visits. Along with the Project 58 (NATO reporting name 'Kynda'-class) cruiser  and other vessels, Grozyashchiy visited Da Nang, Vietnam, between 10 and 14 October 1981. This flotilla formed an important part of the Soviet presence to monitor the conflicts between China and Vietnam that continued to threaten peace in the region in the aftermath of the Sino-Vietnamese War. Between 9 and 13 June 1983, the ship joined the Project 61 (NATO reporting name 'Kashin'-class) destroyer  in visiting Colombo, Sri Lanka.

With the dissolution of the Soviet Union on 26 December 1991, Grozyashchiy was transferred to the Russian Navy. On 18 August the following year, the ship arrived at Dalzavod in Vladivostok for repair. However, a lack of funding meant that, instead, the vessel was decommissioned on 13 February 1995. Disarmament was complete by the end of the year and the remainder was sold in 1997 to a company in the United States to be broken up.

References

Citations

Bibliography

 
 
 
 
 
 
 
 
 
 
 

1977 ships
Cold War frigates of the Soviet Union
Krivak-class frigates
Krivak-class frigates of the Russian Navy
Ships built in the Soviet Union
Ships built at Yantar Shipyard